Unity in diversity is used as an expression of harmony and unity between dissimilar individuals or groups. It is a concept of "unity without uniformity and diversity without fragmentation" that shifts focus from unity based on a mere tolerance of physical, cultural, linguistic, social, religious, political, ideological and/or psychological differences towards a more complex unity based on an understanding that difference enriches human interactions. The idea and related phrase is very old and dates back to ancient times in both Western and Eastern Old World cultures.  It has applications in many fields, including ecology, cosmology, philosophy, religion and politics.

Origins
The concept of unity in diversity can be traced back to Sufi philosopher Ibn al-'Arabi (1165–1240), who advanced the metaphysical concept of the "oneness of being" (wahdat al-wujud), namely, that reality is one, and that God's is the only true existence; all other beings are merely shadows, or reflections of God's qualities. Abd al-Karīm al-Jīlī (1366–1424) expanded on Al-'Arabi's work, using it to describe a holistic view of the universe which reflects "unity in diversity and diversity in unity" (al-wahdah fi'l-kathrah wa'l-kathrah fi'l-wahdah).

Leibniz used the phrase as a definition of "harmony" (Harmonia est unitas in varietate)  in his Elementa verae pietatis, sive de amore dei 948 I.12/A VI.4.1358. Leibniz glosses the definition Harmonia est cum multa ad quandam unitatem revocantur which means the 'Harmony' is when many [things] are restored to some kind of unity.

Religious beliefs
The Old Javanese poem Kakawin Sutasoma, written by Mpu Tantular during the reign of the Majapahit empire sometime in the 14th century, contains the phrase Bhinneka Tunggal Ika, translated as "unity in diversity". The poem is notable as it promotes tolerance between Hindus (especially Shaivites) and Buddhists, stating that although Buddha and Shiva are different in substance, their truths are one:

Unity in diversity is a prominent principle of the Baháʼí Faith. In 1938, in his book The World Order of Baháʼu'lláh, Shoghi Effendi, the Guardian of the Baháʼí Faith, said that "unity in diversity" was the "watchword" for the religion.

ʻAbdu'l-Bahá, the head of the Baháʼí Faith from 1892 to 1921, explained this principle in terms of the oneness of humanity: 

In Indian spiritual teacher Meher Baba's Final Declaration, he stated that "Unity in the midst of diversity can be made to be felt only by touching the very core of the heart. This is the work for which I have come. I have come to sow the seed of love in your hearts so that, in spite of all superficial diversity which your life in illusion must experience and endure, the feeling of oneness through love is brought about amongst all the nations, creeds, sects and castes of the world."

Unity in diversity is also a slogan utilized by the disciples of Swami Sivananda. They came to America to spread the true meaning of Unity in Diversity; that we are All in One & One in All in an all loving ahimsa God.

Dutch Christian theologian Herman Bavinck wrote that principles of “unity in diversity” and “diversity in unity” both flow out of the Christian doctrines of the Imago Dei and the Trinity:Every human being, while a member of the body of humanity as a whole, is at the same time a unique idea of God, with a significance and destiny that is eternal! Every human being is himself or herself an image of God, yet that image is only fully unfolded in humanity as a whole!

— Reformed Dogmatics: Volume 2 (Gereformeerde Dogmatiek), 1895-99

[The Trinity] reveals God to us as the fullness of being, the true life, eternal beauty. In God, too, there is unity in diversity, diversity in unity.

— Reformed Dogmatics: Volume 2 (Gereformeerde Dogmatiek), 1895-99Nagar Chaurasi-The Symbolism Of Unity In Diversity Is Inspiring The Whole World.

India is a country of varying culture,castes, languages and religion and this is what special in India.In Rajgarh(Dhar) the tradition Nagar Chaurasi with faith,religion and belief is a symbolism of unity in diversity which shows brotherhood and mutual reconciliation.It promotes the spirit of brotherhood and harmony for the future of India with its vision of unity in diversity.

In India, people usually see events like Bhandara, Phale Chundari but only people from particular class can celebrate it on the other hand Nagar Chaurasi is an event for every class,which is celebrated in Rajgarh of Dhar district,Madhya Pradesh in India. 

Nagar chaurasi is a tradition where people of all religions and castes eat together,this work is done without any discrimination of religion,caste or class.There is a special view of unity in diversity in this tradition without any discrimination,where people of many religions like Sanatan Dharma, Jainism,Christianity, Islam etc takes part and in fact by this tradition we have raised our culture to new heights. Through Nagar chaurasi the Indian culture gives a message of happiness to the public that "We All Are Equal". 

District Dhar of Madhya Pradesh has been given the name of nagar chaurasi tradition for many years,this tradition is a prestige for everyone or this is such a event in which the whole city is involved.People of all religions and castes sit together on the same floor and do food offerings.In which Hindu-Muslim-Bohra-Jain-Sikh-Christian all come with great joy and take food. The residents of Rajgarh have saved this Nagar Chaurasi till today. In the year 2022 February itself,the grand event of 25th Nagar Chaurasi was held.

India has a very deep roots of Unity in Diversity and this tradition enhances unity in diversity. We celebrate many festivals together simultaneously we share common love and integrity for our heritage. 'Nagar Chaurasi Festival' celebrated in Rajgarh (Dhar), Madhyapradesh, has no exceptions, started in 2001, it is spreading message of unity since almost 2 decades, people from different religion, caste, creed and faith celebrate this every year. In 2022, more than 23000 people become part of it.

The first Nagar Chaurasi was organized on Feb 21, 2001 under the guidance of Shri Purushottam Bharadwaj ji (Ancient Shri Mataji Mandir,Famous Name Bawdi Mandir) representing the Indian tradition of "unity in diversity"

Politics
In modern politics it was first used, as  In varietate unitas, by Ernesto Teodoro Moneta in the context of Italian Unification.

Canada
Adélard Godbout, while Premier of Quebec, published an article entitled "Canada: Unity in Diversity" (1943) in the Council on Foreign Relations journal. He asked,
The phrase has since become somewhat of a staple of Canadian multiculturalism in general. 

The phrase was invoked in the  Interdisciplinary Research Seminar (IRS) at Wilfrid Laurier University in the 1970s. Ervin Laszlo presented his paper entitled "Framework for a General Systems Theory of World Order" (1974) as one of the first seminar Papers that led to the establishment of the IRS in 1975.

The motto of the province of Saskatchewan, adopted in 1986, is a variation, Multis e gentibus vires (from many peoples, strength).

European Union

In 2000, the European Union adopted 'United in Diversity' (Latin: In varietate concordia) as official motto, a reference to the many and diverse member states of the Union in terms of culture. Apart from its English form, the European Union's motto is also official in 23 other languages. "Unity in diversity" was selected by means of a competition involving students from member nations. According to the European Union official website:

India

Jawaharlal Nehru, the first Prime Minister of India and leader of the Indian National Congress, vigorously promoted unity in diversity as an ideal essential to national consolidation and progress. He wrote at length on this topic, exploring it in detail in his work The Discovery of India.

Indonesia

Bhinneka Tunggal Ika, an Old Javanese phrase translated as "Unity in Diversity", is the official national motto of Indonesia.

South Africa
When apartheid South Africa celebrated 20 years of independence on 31 May 1981, the theme of the celebrations was "unity in diversity". Anti-apartheid campaigners denounced the motto as    a cynical attempt to explain away the inequalities in South African life and called on runners of the Comrades Marathon to protest at the co-option of the event by wearing a black armband. The winner of the race, Bruce Fordyce, was one of those wearing a black armband.
The term has since been incorporated into the preamble of the 1996 Constitution of South Africa as a central tenet of post-apartheid South Africa and is currently the national motto.

The United States of America

Indigenous peoples 
The Gwichʼin Tribal Council representing the Gwichʼin, a First Nations of Canada and an Alaskan Native Athabaskan people, who live in the northwestern part of North America, mostly above the Arctic Circle, adopted the motto Unity through Diversity.

See also
Bhinneka Tunggal Ika
Cultural diversity
E pluribus unum
Just society
Unus pro omnibus, omnes pro uno

Citations

References 
 
 
 
 
 
 
 
 
● विविधता में एकता का परिचायक है' परंपरा - नगर चौरासी

● The World Record ‘Largest Multicultural Mass Food Fest’ Has Been Achieved By Nagar Chaurasi  At Rajgarh-Dhar, Madhya Pradesh, India.

● राजगढ़ की नगर चौरासी उत्सव वर्ल्ड रिकॉर्डस में 

● NAGAR CHAURASI FESTIVAL - A UNIQUE TRADITION https://www.worldwideworldrecords.com/post/nagar-chaurasi-festival-a-unique-tradition

Collaboration
Bahá'í belief and doctrine
Mottos
Multiculturalism
Multiculturalism in Canada
Pluralism (philosophy)